Christian Heritage Classical School (CHCS) is a coeducational private school with Christian affiliations in Longview, Texas. It was founded in 1994, and offers classes from four-year-old kindergarten to the twelfth grade. Its enrollment is c. 300 students, with its mascot being the Sentinel.

Location
CHCS is located north of Longview, Texas on a 10-acre campus. Facilities include a science lab, library, a football/soccer field, and an indoor basketball court.

Academics
The average staff to student ratio at CHCS is c. 1:15.  CHCS offers multiple College Board Advanced Placement (AP) courses, and has had a high percentage of students receive National Merit honors compared to other schools in the area.

Extra-curricular activities
CHCS offers baseball, six man football, cross country, basketball, soccer, volleyball, tennis, track, and golf, as well as choir and strings.

Baseball
The school won the 2017 TAPPS 2A State Baseball Championship Title.https://www.etvarsity.com/news/2017/may/20/et-baseball-christian-heritage-brings-home-tapps-s/

Soccer
In 2012, CHCS was the TAPPS (Texas Association of Private and Parochial Schools) 2A state championship in soccer. CHCS was also a state soccer finalist in 2009 and 2010. In 2010, CHS had three players chosen for the TAPPS Fall Soccer All-State first team.

Affiliations
CHCS a non-denominational, classical, Christian school.  It is affiliated with the National Association of Private Schools (NAPS), is a member of the Association of Classical and Christian Schools (ACCS), and is accredited through AdvancED.

References

External links 
 Official website
 National Association of Private Schools

Educational institutions established in 1994
Private K-12 schools in Texas
1994 establishments in Texas